Obriini is a tribe of beetles in the subfamily Cerambycinae

Genera
The following are included in BioLib.cz:

 Agnitosternum Jordan, 1894
 Anatolobrium Adlbauer, 2004
 Anisogaster Deyrolle, 1863
 Bolivarita Escalera, 1914
 Calobrium Fairmaire, 1903
 Capobrium Adlbauer, 2006
 Chinobrium Gressitt, 1937
 Clavobrium Adlbauer, 2008
 Comusia Thomson, 1864
 Conobrium Aurivillius, 1927
 Cylindobrium Adlbauer, 2012
 Duffyoemida Martins, 1977
 Falsallophyton Lepesme, 1953
 Hologaster Vinson, 1961
 Hypomares Thomson, 1864
 Ibidiomimus Pic, 1922
 Ibidionidum Gahan, 1894
 Idobrium Kolbe, 1902
 Indapiodes Miroshnikov & Tichý, 2018
 Iphra Pascoe, 1869
 Iranobrium Villiers, 1967
 Kuegleria Holzschuh, 2017
 Laosobrium Holzschuh, 2007
 Longipalpus Montrouzier, 1861
 Macrobium Gouverneur, 2021
 Mythozoum Thomson, 1878
 Nitidobrium Adlbauer, 2009
 Obrioclytus Adlbauer, 2000
 Obrium Dejean, 1821
 Oculobrium Adlbauer, 2004
 Oemida Gahan, 1904
 Ossibia Pascoe, 1867
 Oxilus Buquet, 1856
 Pseudiphra Gressitt, 1935
 Pseudobolivarita Sama & Orbach, 2003
 Pseudoculobrium Adlbauer, 2010
 Puchneriana Adlbauer, 2015
 Spathuliger Vinson, 1961
 Spiniphra Hayashi, 1961
 Stenhomalus White, 1855
 Synobrium Kolbe, 1893
 Tillomimus Dillon & Dillon, 1952
 Transvaalobrium Adlbauer, 2001
 Uenobrium Niisato, 2006
 Wahn (beetle) McKeown, 1940
 Weigeliella Holzschuh, 2017
 Yemenobrium Adlbauer, 2005
 Zimbabobrium Adlbauer, 2000

References

 
Cerambycinae